Justice (officially the Artsakh Justice Party) is a political party in the Republic of Artsakh. It was founded on 7 September 2018. Marsel Petrosyan, Mikael Soghomonyan, Hakob Hakobyan and Norayr Musaelyan are the party's founders and co-presidents.

Electoral record 
The party participated in the 2020 Artsakhian general election and won 9 seats out of 33 in the National Assembly. The presidential candidate of the party Vitaly Balasanyan, came in third place, gaining 14% of the vote.

Activities 
In April 2021, the party signed a memorandum of cooperation with the Constitutional Rights Union party.

See also 

 List of political parties in Artsakh

External links 
 Justice (Artsakh) on Facebook

References 

Political parties in the Republic of Artsakh
Political parties established in 2018
2018 establishments in Armenia